is a sub-kilometer Near-Earth asteroid and the first Earth trojan discovered; it precedes Earth in its orbit around the Sun. Trojan objects are most easily conceived as orbiting at a Lagrangian point, a dynamically stable location (where the combined gravitational force acts through the Sun's and Earth's barycenter) 60 degrees ahead of or behind a massive orbiting body, in a type of 1:1 orbital resonance. In reality, they oscillate around such a point. Such objects had previously been observed in the orbits of Mars, Jupiter, Neptune, and the Saturnian moons Tethys and Dione.

Its path oscillates about the Sun–Earth  Lagrangian point (60 degrees ahead of Earth), shuttling between its closest approach to Earth and its closest approach to the  point (180 degrees from Earth).

The asteroid was discovered in October 2010 by the NEOWISE team of astronomers using NASA's Wide-field Infrared Survey Explorer (WISE).

Discovery 
WISE, a space telescope launched into Earth orbit in December 2009, imaged  in October 2010 while carrying out a program to scan the entire sky from January 2010 to February 2011. Spotting an asteroid sharing Earth's orbit is normally difficult from the ground, because their potential locations are generally in the daytime sky. After follow-up work at the University of Hawaii and the Canada–France–Hawaii Telescope, its orbit was evaluated on 21 May 2011 and the trojan character of its motion was published in July 2011. The orbital information was published in the journal Nature by Paul Wiegert of the University of Western Ontario, Martin Connors of Athabasca University and Christian Veillet, the executive director of the Canada–France–Hawaii Telescope.

Physical and orbital characteristics 

 has an absolute magnitude of luminosity (determinable because of its known location) of about 20.8. Based on an assumed albedo of 0.1, its estimated diameter is about 300 meters. No spectral data are yet available to shed light on its composition.  would exert a surface gravitational force of less than  that of Earth.

At the time of discovery, the asteroid orbited the Sun with a period of 365.389 days, close to Earth's 365.256 days. As long as it remains in 1:1 resonance with Earth, its average period over long time intervals will exactly equal that of Earth. On its eccentric (e = 0.191) orbit, 's distance from the Sun varies annually from 0.81 AU to 1.19 AU. It orbits in a plane inclined about 21 degrees to the plane of the ecliptic.

Trojans do not orbit right at Lagrangian points but oscillate in tadpole-shaped loops around them (as viewed in a corotating reference frame in which the planet and Lagrangian points are stationary);  traverses its loop over a period of 395 years. 's loop is so elongated that it sometimes travels nearly to the opposite side of the Sun with respect to Earth. Its movements do not bring it any closer to Earth than 20 million kilometers (12.4 million miles), which is more than 50 times the distance to the Moon.  was at the near-Earth end of its tadpole in 2010–2011, which facilitated its discovery.

's orbit has a chaotic character, making long-range predictions difficult. Prior to 500 AD, it may have been oscillating about the  Lagrangian point (60 degrees behind Earth), before jumping to  via . Newer calculations based on an improved orbit determination confirm these results.

Accessibility from Earth 

Because Earth trojans share Earth's orbit and have little gravity of their own, less energy might be needed to reach them than the Moon, even though they are much more distant. However,  is not an energetically attractive target for a space mission because of its orbital inclination: It moves so far above and below Earth's orbit that the required change in velocity for a spacecraft to match its trajectory coming from Earth's would be 9.4 km/s, whereas some other near-Earth asteroids require less than 4 km/s.

See also 
 , the second Earth trojan discovered
 Claimed moons of Earth
 Provisional designation in astronomy, the naming convention used for astronomical objects immediately following their discovery

Notes

References

External links 
 MPC Database entry for 
 NASA animation of its motion
 Alternate NASA animation of  motion
 
 
 

Minor planet object articles (unnumbered)

20101001